Jane Mary "Ostler" Groenewegen (born November 8, 1956) is a territorial level politician from northern Canada and a former member of the Legislative Assembly of the Northwest Territories.

Political career
Groenewegen was first elected to a seat in the Northwest Territories Legislature in the 1995 Northwest Territories general election. She was returned by acclamation in the 1999 Northwest Territories general election. She was appointed to the cabinet by Premier Stephen Kakfwi and she served as Deputy Premier Minister of Health and Social Services, Minister Responsible for Seniors, Persons with Disabilities and the Status of Women.

Groenewegen was elected to a third term in the 2003 Northwest Territories general election. She was not re-appointed to the cabinet and was elected Deputy Speaker. She was elected to a fourth term in the 2007 Northwest Territories general election. Her son Jeff Groenewegen also ran in that election in the electoral district of Frame Lake, but was not elected. Jane was re-elected to a fifth term in the 2011 Northwest Territories general election. In 2015 she was defeated by Wally Schumann. Unofficial tallies put her on 274 votes to Schumann's 372.

Electoral record

References

External links
Jane Groenewegen Legislature biography

1956 births
Members of the Legislative Assembly of the Northwest Territories
Living people
Women MLAs in the Northwest Territories
People from Hay River
Deputy premiers of the Northwest Territories
People from Huron County, Ontario
21st-century Canadian politicians
21st-century Canadian women politicians
Women government ministers of Canada